In aviation, visual meteorological conditions (VMC) is an aviation flight category in which visual flight rules (VFR) flight is permitted—that is, conditions in which pilots have sufficient visibility to fly the aircraft maintaining visual separation from terrain and other aircraft. They are the opposite of instrument meteorological conditions (IMC). The boundary criteria between IMC and VMC are known as the VMC minima and are defined by: visibility, cloud ceilings (for takeoffs and landings), and cloud clearances.

The exact requirements vary by type of airspace, whether it is day or night (for countries that permit night VFR), and from country to country. Typical visibility requirements vary from one statute mile to five statute miles (many countries define these in metric units as 1,500 m to 8 km). Typical cloud clearance requirements vary from merely remaining clear of clouds to remaining at least one mile away (1,500 m in some countries) from clouds horizontally and 1,000 feet away from clouds vertically. For instance, in Australia, VMC minima outside controlled airspace are clear of cloud with 5,000 m visibility below 3,000 ft AMSL or 1,000 ft AGL (whichever is higher), and 1,000 ft vertical/1,500 m horizontal separation from cloud above these altitudes or in controlled airspace. Above 10,000 ft, 8,000 m visibility is required to maintain VMC. Air traffic control may also issue a "special VFR" clearance to VFR aircraft, to allow departure from a control zone in less than VMC – this reduces the visibility minimum to 1,600 m.

Generally, VMC requires greater visibility and cloud clearance in controlled airspace than in uncontrolled airspace. In uncontrolled airspace there is less risk of a VFR aircraft colliding with an instrument flight rules (IFR) aircraft emerging from a cloud, so aircraft are permitted to fly closer to clouds. An exception to this rule is class B airspace, in which ATC separates VFR traffic from all other traffic (VFR or IFR), which is why in class B airspace lower cloud clearance is permitted.

European and UK VFR minima 
The following minima apply in Europe and the UK.

Uncontrolled airspace (class F & G) 
At and above FL 100:
8 km flight visibility, 1500 m horizontally from cloud, 1000 ft (300m) vertically from cloud
Below FL 100:
5 km flight visibility, 1500 m horizontally from cloud, 1000 ft (300m) vertically from cloud
At or below 3,000 ft:
5 km flight visibility, clear of cloud and in sight of the surface
or, for an aircraft, other than a helicopter, operating at 140 kt or less:
1,500 m flight visibility, clear of cloud and in sight of the surface
For helicopters:
Clear of cloud and in sight of the surface at a speed which is commensurate with the visibility.

Controlled airspace (classes C to E) By Day 
At and above FL 100:
8 km flight visibility, 1,500 m horizontally from cloud, 1,000 ft (300m) vertically from cloud
Below FL 100:
5 km flight visibility, 1,500 m horizontally from cloud, 1,000 ft (300m) vertically from cloud
Alternatively at or below 3,000 and operating at 140kt or less ft:

For helicopters:
Clear of cloud and in sight of surface with a flight visibility of 1500m

Controlled airspace (classes C to E) By Night 
At and above FL 100:
8 km flight visibility, 1,500 m horizontally from cloud, 1,000 ft (300m) vertically from cloud
Below FL 100:
5 km flight visibility, 1,500 m horizontally from cloud, 1,000 ft (300m) vertically from cloud

Canada VFR minima

Uncontrolled Airspace (class G):

Surface to 1000 feet AGL 
Day: Clear of Cloud. 2 statute miles for fixed wing, 1 statute mile for helicopter

Night: Clear of Cloud. 3 statute miles visibility.

Above 1000 feet AGL 
Day:  2000 feet horizontally, 500 feet vertically from cloud. 1 statute mile visibility

Night: 2000 feet horizontally, 500 feet vertically from cloud. 3 statute miles visibility

Controlled Airspace (any class B, C, D, E) 
1 mile horizontally, 500 feet vertically from cloud. 3 statute miles visibility.

Control Zones (can consist of B thru E) 
Maintain at least 500 feet AGL except when taking off or landing.

Class A airspace 
VFR flight prohibited in Class A airspace.

US VFR minima 
United States Visual Flight Rules are provided in Title 14 of the Code of Federal Regulations, Part 91, Section 155:

Notes

See also
 List of meteorology topics
 Airspace class (United States)

References

External links
U.S. Federal Aviation Regulations defining visual meteorological conditions.
Guide to Visual Flight Rules in the UK
SERA.5001: Common Rules of the air
Air traffic control